Kings Mountain is an unincorporated community in southern Kentucky. Kings Mountain has a post office with ZIP code 40442.

References

Unincorporated communities in Lincoln County, Kentucky
Unincorporated communities in Kentucky